Scotus or SCOTUS may refer to:
 Supreme Court of the United States
 Scotus Academy, Edinburgh, Scotland
 SCOTUSblog
 Scotus Central Catholic High School, Nebraska
 Scotus College, Glasgow, Scotland
 Scotus, Latin name for Erebus

People named Scotus or Scottus
 Aaron Scotus (died 1052), Irish abbot
 Marianus Scotus of Regensburg (died c. 1088), Irish saint
 David the Scot (died c. 1138), Bishop of Bangor
 David Scotus (died 1139), Irish historian
 Duns Scotus (died 1308), Scottish theologian and philosopher
 Haddingtonus Scotus (1467–1550), Scottish philosopher, see John Major (philosopher)
 Joseph Scottus (died near 800), Irish deacon, scholar, diplomat, poet, and ecclesiastic
 John Scotus Eriugena, Irish theologian
 John Scotus (bishop of Dunkeld) (12th century), Bishop of St Andrews and Dunkeld
 John Scotus (bishop of Mecklenburg) ( – 1066), Bishop of Mecklenburg and Glasgow
 Marianus Scotus of Mainz (1028 – ), Irish monk
 Marianus Scotus of Regensburg (died about 1088), Irish abbot of St Peter's at Ratisbon (Regensburg) 
 Marius Scotus (8th–9th century), a Scottish paladin of Charlemagne, see Ruspoli family
 Michael Scot (Latin: Michael Scotus; 1175 – ), mathematician and scholar
 Sedulius Scottus (9th century), Irish teacher, grammarian and Scriptural commentator

See also
 Scot, British people
 Scoti or Scotti, Latin name for the Gaels
 Scott (disambiguation)